Islami Jamiat-e-Talaba  IJT is the largest student organization in Pakistan. It was founded by 25 students on 23 December 1947 at Lahore, Pakistan. Islami Jamiat-e-Talaba is working in Pakistan to eliminate the non-Islamic elements and secularism from the curriculum and teachings of the educational institutions of Pakistan. It is a member of the International Islamic Federation of Student Organizations and the World Assembly of Muslim Youth.

IJT was influenced mainly by the works of the late Syed Abul-Ala Maududi and  Maulana Naeem Siddiqui. It is an Islamic organization whose stated mission is to preach Islam to students of modern institutions throughout Pakistan. From the 1970s until about the early 1990s it was also the main ideological engine powering the concept of political Islam on the country's university and college campuses. It attempts to promote its vision of Islamic values and glorify the image of Islam through various means. Its main fields are the modern educational institutions, i.e. colleges and universities across Pakistan, though many local sub-divisions are active at the school level, like Bazm-e-Sathi, Bazm-e-Paigham, Bazm-e-Roshni.

History 
Islami Jamiat-e-Talaba was founded on 23 December 1947 in Lahore, and is one of the oldest student organizations in Pakistan. The headquarters of IJT is in the city of Lahore. Islami Jamiat-e-Talaba's ideology is not based on any language and ethnic origin. The women's wing of the party, with the same ideology but with a separate structure and organisation, is known as Islami Jamiat-e-Talibaat. 

It has a counterpart of the same ideology but with a complete, separate and independent structure and organisation, known as Jamiat Talaba Arabia Pakistan. (JT Arabia works in religious institutions of Pakistan.)

Islami Jamiat-e-Talaba is continuously struggling by keeping their voice up for the revival of students unions after the ban.

Motto 
Islami Jamiat Talaba's purpose or motto is "To seek the pleasure of Allah Almighty by ordering human life in accordance with the principles laid down by Allah and His Messenger Muhammad (peace be upon him)."

 Dawah (Call to Allah) - Conveying the message of Islam to the students and inspiring them to acquire knowledge and to arouse in them the sense of responsibility to practice Islam in full.
 Organization - To organize the students who are ready to partake in the struggle for establishing the Islamic way of life within the fold of this organization.
 Training - To take appropriate steps to impart Islamic knowledge among the students integrated under the organization to make them men of character, capable of braving the challenges of Jahilyah and, thus, to prove the superiority of Islam.
 Islamic Education Movement and Student-oriented Problems - To struggle for changing the existing system of education on the basis of Islamic values to build up ideal citizens and enhance leadership to solve real problems of the students.
 Establishing Islamic Social Order - To strive tooth-and-nail to establish Islamic social order for freeing humanity from all forms of economic exploitation, political oppression and cultural servitude.

List of chief administrators

Controversies
Islami Jamiat-e-Talaba has been continuously speaking against campus violence in the name of ethnicity. It has been allegedly linked with Islamic Brotherhood but IJT denies any link and said that, "It is a false  accusation to disrupt our mission by the secular lobbies".

Notable alumni

 Ansar Abbasi
 Shahid Khaqan Abbasi
 Qazi Hussain Ahmed
 Sohail Ahmed
 Wajihuddin Ahmed
 Arif Alvi
 Amir Cheema
 Fayyaz ul Hassan Chohan
 Hussain Haqqani
 Javed Hashmi
 Ahsan Iqbal
 Orya Maqbool Jan
 Qamar Zaman Kaira
 Abdul Qadeer Khan
 Karnal Sher Khan
 Mushahid Ullah Khan
 Shahid Masood
 Hamid Mir
 Abdul Malik Mujahid
 Asad Qaiser
 Khawaja Saad Rafique 
 Saleem Safi
 Raheel Sharif
 Shaukat Aziz Siddiqui
 Qamar Javed Bajwa
 Ali Muhammad Khan

See also
 Jamaat-e-Islami Pakistan

References

External links
 Official website
 IJT official blog
 An Islamic Video/Audio Portal :: A Project of Karachi Jamiat

1947 establishments in Pakistan
Far-right politics in Pakistan
Islamist groups
Jamaat-e-Islami Pakistan
Student organizations established in 1947
Student religious organisations in Pakistan
Student wings of political parties in Pakistan
Students' federations of Pakistan